The 2022 FIBA Women's European Championship for Small Countries was the 17th edition of this competition. The tournament took place in Nicosia, Cyprus, from 28 June to 3 July 2022. Luxembourg were the defending champion; but they didn't participate in this edition.

Participating teams

Results

All times are local (UTC+3).

References

FIBA Women's European Championship for Small Countries
Small Countries
International basketball competitions hosted by Cyprus
2022 in Cypriot sport
FIBA
FIBA